Liopasia meridionalis is a moth in the family Crambidae. It was described by Schaus in 1920. It is found in Brazil (Paraná).

References

Moths described in 1920
Spilomelinae